The Aerocar 2000 was a proposed flying car under development in the early 2000s in the United States. The Aerocar 2000 was designed by Ed Sweeney, who was inspired by Moulton Taylor's Aerocar of the 1950s (and is the owner of the only still-flying example of this vehicle).  The Aerocar 2000 consisted of a removable wings, tail, and powerplant "flight module" added to a modified Lotus Elise roadster.

Comparison to original Aerocar

In conception, this was far closer to the AVE Mizar of the early 1970s than to Taylor's designs, the vehicle portions of which were purpose-designed and built. Another difference with the original Aerocar (and similarity to the Mizar) is that the flight module is not designed to be taken away from the airfield. Finally, while the Aerocar used the one engine to drive both the road wheels and the propeller, the Aerocar 2000 (again like the Mizar) uses two separate engines. In the Aerocar 2000's case, the flight engine is a twin-turbocharged V-8 motor from a Lotus Esprit. A far lighter three-cylinder engine and gearbox from a Chevrolet Sprint is to be installed in the road module to power the vehicle on the ground.

Specifications (Aerocar 2000, as designed)

References

External links

Homebuilt aircraft
Roadable aircraft
Abandoned civil aircraft projects of the United States
High-wing aircraft
Single-engined tractor aircraft